Humpherys is a surname. Notable people with the surname include:

David Humpherys (born 1972), American Magic: The Gathering player
Douglas Humpherys, American pianist, educator, and adjudicator

See also
Humphery
Humphreys (disambiguation)
Humphries
Humphrys

English-language surnames